Proteuxoa hydraecioides is a moth of the family Noctuidae. It is found in Tasmania, Victoria, New South Wales and South Australia.

Larvae have been recorded on Tropaeolum majus.

External links
Australian Faunal Directory
Australian Insects

Proteuxoa
Moths of Australia
Moths described in 1852